Freshford railway station is a railway station serving the village of Freshford, Bath and North East Somerset, England. It also serves the nearby village of Limpley Stoke in Wiltshire. The station has two platforms and is served by Great Western Railway.

For many years the station had a notable flower garden maintained by the Vaisey sisters. This later faded but in 2007 local residents renovated the garden and planted new flowers in the memory of the Vaisey sisters. A few weeks later staff from Network Rail cut down all the flowers.

In February 2006, Platform 2 at Freshford was raised by 30 cm to reduce the large stepping gap between the train and the platform. It had been lowered in 1988 as part of the realignment of the track through the station to allow trains to pass at a faster speed. At the same time the platform was raised, the station also received additional improvements including better lighting and the construction of a new waiting shelter.

Accidents and incidents
On 12 November 2008, a passenger train collided with a van on a level crossing at Freshford. There were no injuries.

Services

See also
 Wilts, Somerset and Weymouth Railway

References

Railway stations in Bristol, Bath and South Gloucestershire
Railway stations in Great Britain opened in 1857
Former Great Western Railway stations
Railway stations served by Great Western Railway
1857 establishments in England
DfT Category F2 stations